Wuchereria is a genus of nematodes belonging to the family Onchocercidae.

The species of this genus are found in Europe, Northern America, Africa.

Species:

Wuchereria bancrofti 
Wuchereria kalimantani .

References

Rhabditida
Rhabditida genera